Barren primarily refers to a state of barrenness (infertility)

Barren may also refer to:

Places
Barren, Missouri
Barren County, Kentucky
Barren Island (Andaman Islands)
Barren Island, Brooklyn
Barren River Lake

Other uses
Barren County (album)
Barren County Progress (newspaper)
Barren Realms Elite (game)
Barren strawberry, various meanings
Barren vegetation
Cape Barren goose

See also
 Baron
 Barren Ground (disambiguation)
 Barrens (disambiguation)